The Fujitsu Red Wave are a basketball team based in Kawasaki, Kanagawa, playing in the Women's Japan Basketball League.

Notable players
Miwa Kuribayashi
Rui Machida
Ai Mitani
Moeko Nagaoka
Yōko Nagi
Monica Okoye
Mio Shinozaki
Ayumi Suzuki
Masami Tachikawa
Chinatsu Yamamoto
Ryoko Yano

Coaches
Akemi Okazato
Natsumi Yabuuchi
BT Toews

Venues
Tokkei Security Hiratsuka General Gymnasium
Yokohama Cultural Gymnasium
Yokosuka Arena

References

External links
 Official website

Basketball teams in Japan
Basketball teams established in 1985
1985 establishments in Japan
Fujitsu
Sport in Kawasaki, Kanagawa